The Americas Zone was one of the three zones of the regional Davis Cup competition in 1990.

In the Americas Zone there were two different tiers, called groups, in which teams competed against each other to advance to the upper tier.

Group I
Winners in Group I advanced to the World Group Qualifying Round, along with losing teams from the World Group first round. Teams who lost their respective first round ties competed in the relegation play-off, with the winning teams remaining in Group I, whereas the team who lost their play-off was relegated to the Americas Zone Group II in 1991.

Participating nations

Draw

  and  advance to World Group Qualifying Round.

  relegated to Group II in 1991.

First round

Canada vs. Brazil

Uruguay vs. Chile

Second round

Paraguay vs. Canada

Uruguay vs. Peru

Relegation play-off

Brazil vs. Chile

Group II
The winner in Group II advanced to the Americas Zone Group I in 1991.

Participating nations

Draw

  promoted to Group I in 1991.

First round

Trinidad and Tobago vs. Haiti

Venezuela vs. Jamaica

Colombia vs. Guatemala

Dominican Republic vs. Costa Rica

Barbados vs. Bolivia

Second round

Haiti vs. Ecuador

Cuba vs. Venezuela

Dominican Republic vs. Colombia

Barbados vs. Bahamas

Third round

Cuba vs. Ecuador

Barbados vs. Colombia

Fourth round

Cuba vs. Colombia

References

External links
Davis Cup official website

Davis Cup Americas Zone
Americas Zone